Elavumthitta Market celebrated its centenary year in 2009. In the year of 1909 Mooloor S Padmanabha Panicker Who was a member of 'Sreemoolam Prajasabha' had established the Elavumthitta market in the 2 acres (8,100 m2) of land near the Elavumthitta Junction. He named the market as "Sreemoolam Rajagopalavilasam".[1]

Mooloor Panicker
The name of Elavumthitta is synonymous with Mooloor S Padmanabha Panicker. For People outside Elavumthitta, Mooloor was just only a great poet of his time. He was more than that, he fought with the so-called elite groups of writers of his time. These writers thought and behaved arrogantly as if they were the sole custodians of literature. Initially to discourage Mooloor they mocked at his literary works and questioned his right to do such exercise; openly quoting the cast he belonged. That was enough to raise the sleeping lion – the literary genius in Mooloor. Armed with his mighty pen and charged with the divine blessings of Sree Narayana Guru, he fought alone- it can be compared only with the legendary Abhimanyu the warrior of Mahabharat, who was trapped and slain by the veteran warriors. Here it was different, though he was cornered and attacked by the conservative veterans of letters; Mooloor could indeed come out of every fight victorious, and in the end, his rivalries made peace with him. The poetic mind could, not only write beautiful poems of his time; being a visionary, he saw that Elavumthitta is lagging behind in every social need of that time. Be it in education, or in infrastructures, like roads or in marketing facilities for the agricultural produce- the place was famous for- needed immediate attention. His proximity with the rulers of Travancore made the tough task one by one into reality.

In 1914 he was nominated to 'Sreemulam Prajasabha' by the Maharaja of Travancore. Fourteen years he was in that position and made dramatic changes in the society. His plea in the assembly for social justice to everyone in the society irrespective of one's caste and creed was heard throughout Kerala. When there was taboo for members belonging to certain castes walking on public roads or entering temples, Mooloor made schools to educate them, made temples for them to worship, and made public roads for everyone's use.

He was the main architect for shaping the Elavumthitta market. Most of the important roads in Kozhechery Taluk were made under his leadership. He founded more than 20 educational institutions in Elavumthitta and other parts of Kerala.
He expired in 1931 at the age of 62 leaving behind a great void, difficult to fill by another one. In 1989 Govt. of Kerala built a memorial at the place he lived in his last days, barely 3 km away from the Elavumthitta market junction. The memorial and its serene surrounding remind one, what a great soul was lived there once.
The place is a pilgrim centre for many literary luminaries. In every year on the vijayadasmiday hundreds of parents bring their children to get initiated into the world of letters here. Locally the ritual is called 'Ezhuthiniruth'.
The objective of the memorial is to familiarize the present generation with the rich social as well as literary contribution of the poet and keep his memory alive. A few years ago in an interview for the police department, one board member asked an aspiring candidate --

"Well gentleman, your bio-data says you are a native of Elavumthitta. I understand Mooloor the great poet was from there. Now tell us something about him".

It is sad that our young man had to admit his ignorance. The young man should know that a man named Mooloor S Padmanabha Panicker was instrumental in making Elavumthitta with the facilities he enjoys now. Let our youngsters grow with the memories of the great people like Mooloor.

Nostalgia
Life is not what one lived, but what one remembers and how one remembers it in order to recount it. Before adolescence, memory is more interested in the future than the past, and so my recollections of the town were not yet idealized by nostalgia. I remember it as it was: a good place to live where everybody knew everybody else…

Gabriel Garcia Marquez ( From the pages of his autobiography – Living to Tell the Tale)

Aswathy
The most important annual festival for the people of Elavumthitta is the Celebration of Aswathy in the Malayalam month of meenam. No doubt Onam is the biggest festival of every Keralite, but this Asawathy celebration is exclusively for the People of Elavumthitta. Every child in Elavumthitta will be waiting for this occasion; the tips he gets now and then- let the sum may be a meager one – is kept as his secret treasure; reserved for this great day. He has to buy many items. The seasonal crops of cashew is of great help; cashew picked up from here and there is sold and the amount may be a pittance in today's standard, but the thrill of spending it in the aswathy fair is something one will remember till his death.

There is a worshiping place in the corner of market; the place is called Malanada. The deity of Malanada is the god of hills. The annual celebration is to appease the Malanada deity. The colorful and important item of the celebration is the pageantry display. Images of oxen of more than life size and multicolored are made and displayed in single or in pairs mounted on wooden platforms and drawn along the road by hundreds of over enthusiastic rural population is a sight to be seen to believe its electrifying effect on the crowd lined on both sides of the road. The loud and reverberating sound of the percussion musical instruments drowns the shouting of the crowds. The setting sun plays its myriad colors on the scenario; everyone in the crowd pushing forward a little to have a good look. A child perching on the shoulder of his father is weeping over his ruptured balloon. These are all familiar sight one can see in the middle of any rural festival.

In another place, typical wares of such occasions are spread on the floor of makeshift sheds and are in great demand. Young girls are making bargaining over colorful glass bangles. Children are pestering their parents for the multicolored balloons. Then some are lucky they got toy bugles; impatient to put it on test children started blowing it and experimenting it in various combinations of tunes to the annoyance of elders. Nobody noticed it; the sun is disappeared and the darkness crept in. Traders brought out their giant kerosene lamps and lit. The orange colored flames of the kerosene lamps leaping upward as if trying to lick the festive atmosphere; making surreal shades of people jostling around. People coming from distant places are in a hurry to go back. Children are reluctant to comply with the elders and ignoring their protests they, being physically dragged out of the fair, weeps all the way back home. The rural alleyways otherwise lonely and dark on normal days are, today with crowds of people with burning torches made out of dry coconut leaves; either going to the fair or making the homeward journey. Battery operated flashlight torches were very rare and then and only a few fashionable people were having it. Night long variety folk arts culminating into fireworks are the attraction of the fair. Fireworks were the major attraction; to witness this many sleep in the fair ground and at the sound of the first cracker they get up.

Next day the less fortunate who were confined in their home get up in the early morning, hearing the news of someone is stabbed and hospitalized or somebody is seriously beaten. Following weeks will be busy for the rural populations in debating over and over on these topics. Rural festivals were not only the venue for exhibiting rural arts; it was also a venue for settling the yearlong pending issues of bitter feud among different groups.

Cattle market

Elavumthitta market popularly known as Elavumthitta Chandha(ഇലവുംതിട്ട ചന്ത) celebrated its 100th year in September 2009. There is an important landmark in the middle of Elavumthitta- a huge banyan tree. How old the tree is, nobody knows, eight hundred years or more that is anybody's guess. Some say it is more than that. One thing is certain, that it gave shelter to generations of weary travelers, it witnessed the political changes of Kerala, listening fiery speeches of politicians who make makeshift stage on its platform now and then; unaffected by either political speeches or religious sermons; stand there majestically giving shelter to birds on its long branches with thick green foliage and feeding its seasonal fruits to the needy birds.

The market was very famous for the cattle trading. Traders from faraway places like Thiruvananthapuram used to come here for either selling or buying cattle. The ninth day of every Malayalam month was the market day exclusively for cattle trading. People from faraway places come to the market, a day or two in advance to secure a vantage spot to exhibit their cattle. In those days Space in the market was very little, roads were very narrow, owners of vacant land adjoining the market allowed the traders to occupy the land free or by paying a small fee. Some smart local guys drive stakes for tying the cattle and rent it for money. Suddenly the tea shops otherwise dull throughout the month will wake up and keep open their shop day and night. Some shopkeepers hire petromax for this special night business. The whole place will become noisy with the loud shouting and bargaining of agents and middle men, the pitiful frightened crying of animals especially the mournful Call of lambs. It was difficult to pass along the narrow road in the market day, swash! You will be jumping in fright; you got a whip of a cow with its tail plastered with dung and urine. The whole area is covered with dung and urine of cattle. The stink will be lingering in the air till the next market day.
Now the cattle market is held twice in a month, 9th and 22nd of every Malayalam month. There is similar cattle market now in many places and the importance of the Elavumthitta cattle market is not like the earlier days.

Weekly market

Every Wednesday and Saturday is market day for people of Elavumthitta. In olden days the economy of Elavumthitta was closely related with agriculture produce. There was no rubber plantation then. People cultivated mainly paddy in wet land; dry land was used for growing Coconut palm, cashew trees, Tapioca, Pepper, gram, horse gram, green gram, red gram, filler millet, pineapple, mango, Plantain, bitter gourd, snake gourd, ash pumpkin, Pumpkin, lady's finger, chilies, drumstick, yam . The foothills had plenty of watershed fertile land; anything sown gave a rich return. Poor man's staple food was Tapioca and sea fish. The weekly market was not only for selling and buying, it was a meeting ground and a venue for the local people to exchange pleasantries. Market day was a reference point for the local people in their conversation. Schedule of important assignments were changed or shifted or postponed taking the market day into account. The market was also a venue for the young to develop familiarity with opposite sex and that in course of time develops into intimacy and then culminated in marriage.

Fish and tapioca was the staple food for the common man. Fish market had an important place in the market... Fish vendors bring fish from faraway places of coastal areas. The fish was brought in huge baskets on by cycles in its carrier and sure enough it required dexterity and stamina peddling miles and miles on rough roads. The market will have its full sitting around 11:00 am and continue till late afternoon. Market day was appreciated by taking into account the cost of fish available on that day. People on the way to the market ask persons returning from the market -

"How is the fish today"?

Weighing of fish was not heard in those days. Sardines fish was very popular. Sometimes sardines were so cheap, one can have even fifty sardines for 4 Annas, equivalent of today's 25 paisa. Coconut Palms were plenty in Elavumthitta. Some family's annual income was solely on coconuts. Plucking coconuts 3 to 4 times in a year and selling to the merchants not only was a common practice in those days, it was a necessity. It is said that in those days almost one million coconuts were traded in a market day. Three to four truckloads of coconut husk-a raw material for making coir- used to be sent to other parts of Kerala where coir trading was active. Presently rubber is the main cash crop. Anyone with little land will have few rubber trees; three to four rubber Sheets will be enough to meet his immediate cash requirements for the market day.

Seasonal crops like cashew and pepper had a ready market. Merchants sitting in a row with hand balance and cloth bags for weighing merchandise were a common sight in those days. Clay pots were displayed in the market. Bamboo made baskets, large size mats for drying paddy, ladle made out of coconut shells, why you name a thing it will be available in the weekly market. Yes indeed it was an open market, every item was kept in the open ground

Sivagiri pilgrimage

The Sivagiri pilgrimage or Sivagiri Teerthadanam was started in 1932 from Elavumthitta. The first pilgrims-P.K.Divakara Panicker, P.K.Kesavan, P.V.Raghavan, M.K.Raghavan, and S.Sankunni-were all from Elavumthitta.

Mooloor S. Padmanābha Panicker
Mooloor S. Padmanābha Panicker (Sarasa kavi Mooloor) was one of the great poets and a prominent social reform activist from Travancore. He was born at Panayannaarkavu, close to the town of Mannar in Central Travancore in 1869 (Malayalam year Kumbhom 27, 1044 ). He named his residence in Elavumthitta as 'Kerala Varma Soudham' as a mark of respect towards Kerala Varma Valiyakoyi Thampuran who was his close friend.

Mooloor Smarakom
In the year 1989 the State Government proclaimed 'Kerala Varma Soudham' (residence of Mooloor) as 'Sarasa Kavi Mooloor Smarakam'. Now this monument is preserved by the State Department of Culture. The objective of the Mooloor Smarakam is to familiarise the present generation with the rich social as well as literary contributions of the poet and to keep his memory alive.

Ezhuthiniruthu
Mooloor Smarakam is now famous for "Ezhuthiniruthu" (The occasion on which children are initiated into the world of letters). On the day of Vijayadasami children are initiated into the world of letters at Mooloor Smarakam. Prominent personalities will be present on this auspicious day.

Memories

....memory is what makes our lives. Life without memory is no life at all... Our memory is our coherence, our reason, our feeling, even our action. Without it, we are nothing...
-- Luis Buñuel

Thumpamon–Thekkemala Road
ELAVUMTHITTA GETS GOVT TRANSPORT BUS IN 1957 AT GUN POINT.

There was a time when people of Elavumthitta solely depending on the soles of their heels to travel out of Elavumthitta. Be it for getting medical aid or attending schools or college one has to travel miles and miles – kilometers were not heard in those days – why even in the recent past rural elders refer distance as "nazhika." One "nzhika" is roughly one mile. There were cases; students walked in the morning all the way to Thiruvalla a place 30 km away to attend college and then walking back 30 km. in the evening on their homeward journey. Sure enough it was a tough task.

There were hurdles in connecting Elavumthitta with other places by public transport system. Motorable roads were not there. The road from Ambalakadavu Jn. in Thumpamon to Elavumthitta was very narrow. In 1950's it was only a cart track. Similarly one has to walk all the way to Thekkemala Jn. near Kozhencherry to sight a bus.

Then in 1953-54 two bridges were made near Punnakkad on Thekkemala Elavumthitta road. Two more bridges/ culverts were made south of Elavumthitta near Ramanchira in 1945–53. The construction of the bridge and the road over heavy filling in the paddy field near Ramanchira was undertaken by contractor Mr.M.G George of Mannil, Nellanikunnu.
Then in 1954 one Private bus service started from Kallisseri to Omalloor. The bus service was known"DAILY EXPRESS" . The bus with its long front to accommodate the engine and turning its dynamo with a handle to start the bus reminded the first world war scenario.

Now the stage is set to pressurize the newly elected democratic Govt. of Kerala for public transport bus. Kambisseril Sankaran Vaidyan,(elder brother of kambisseril Karunakaran) the then president of Mezhuveli panchayat, used his personal influence to the Transport Minister M.N Govindan Nair. The Bus route was sanctioned with a condition that road must be made motorable. Govt.officials surveyed the route, starting from Ambalakadavu to Thekkemala and suggested to straighten the sharp bends and widen the road at several locations. This must be done by the local public at their cost.

Sri.Sankaran vaidiyan, the panchayat president, organized volunteers for this task. The owner of the land near a stretch at Ramanchira won't relent widening the road. He feared that people might force into his property and widen the road. Armed with a court stay order he sought police protection. People were adamant, one fine morning hundreds of people armed with pickaxe, shovel, and crowbar and baskets were there in the disputed site, and started uprooting trees. Owner of the land sent his messenger to the Pandalam police station requesting the police to intervene and prevent the forced encroachment in his land. The Sub Inspector reached the site in no time. Seeing the Inspector people were scattered; news gone to Sankaran Vaidyan. He rushed to the spot, and faced the Inspector-

The Inspector was adamant, he drew his revolver and pointing it to Sankaran Vaidiyan ordered him to move away. Sankaran Vaidyan called the people and asked them to continue with their works. Awaiting the call people with a loud cry started their works more vigorously. Sounds of percussion instruments like "Chenda", which was a must in those days for such occasions drowned the voice of law. It was Sankaran vaidyan's day; vaidyan offered a cigarette to the sullen Inspector, and also helped him lighting it . Thus in 1953-54 the long cherished dream of people of Elavumthitta became fulfilled- they got "transport bus"!.

It is sad that many daring heroes of those days who shaped the destiny of Elavumthitta are no more with us but the memory will never die.

T K Kunjumman Road
In 1948, CSI church member of  Nellanikunnu, Adv.V.K Varghese who was also the MLA of Pathanamthitta constituency brought the matter to the notice of PWD authorities that a motorable road from Elavumthitta to Omalloor was an urgent need of the time. Later Thekkethil Sri. Kunjumman took the leadership, and not only in widening the road: his charismatic leadership brought bus service to this place. He was also the Panchayat President of Chenneerkkara for several terms. In 1950's when Govt of Kerala started establishing Primary Health Centre in different localities, he made frequent visits to Thiruvananthapuram and got one sanctioned for Elavumthitta area. Sri. Kuzhimannil K.C Kurien was kind enough to donate the land for the Nellanikkunu Primary Health Centre.

In the earlier days, most of the people of Elavumthitta, being agricultural farmers had to keep plenty of cattle. One veterinary hospital was a dire need for the locality. From the 2nd five-year plan onwards, government was keen in giving attention to such social requirements.  Under the leadership of Kunjumman Sir, the CSI Church members and the public impressed the authorities and succeeded in getting a veterinary hospital for Elavumthitta. From the year 1960 people started getting veterinary services. Then a good Samaritan  Vadakkedethu Sri. V.T Chaco donated the land for building the Veterinary Hospital. In 1960 veterinary Hospital started its activities in its own building. In recognition of Thekkethil Mr. Kunjumman's selfless service, the  Govt. of Kerala named Elavumthitta – Omalloor road as "TK KUNJUMMAN ROAD".

Arts and sports

Azad arts and sports club 

People of Elavumthitta had no entertainment in earlier days other than the "aswathi maholsvam" celebrated once in a year. Cinema halls were 10 to 20 km away. Convenient bus service to reach the cinema hall in time for the show or to come back from the show were not available then. Still some tough adventurists used to trek all the way to Pathanamthitta, Pandalam, Kozhencherry, or Chengannur wherever the popular pictures were shown, and stealthily come back avoiding getting caught by the elders, in the early hours of the night after watching the movie. Surely the adventurism if found invited the ire of elders and scornful look of neighbors. Those were the days everyone had a right to admonish the young, be it a neighbor or a stranger, the action gets ready approval of the parents.

The impact of KPAC drama, successfully spreading revolutionary ideas among common people for social changes, were closely watched by educated and progressive minded youths of Elavumthitta. At the stroke of 5 o'clock in the evening of 26 January 1957 Republic Day, when rest of the country was celebrating the occasion; Elavumthitta celebrated it in a unique way – They formed a club and named it as AZAD ARTS AND SPORTS CLUB, glorifying to the world the name of the freedom fighter Maulana Abulkalam Azad. The name was suggested by Sri. C. Chandra Dattan. MA. There was a meeting held in SNDP hall of Nediyakala, barely one and a half km away from Elavumthitta market. Besides Mr. Chandra Dattan, members present in the meeting were; Mr.V.R Gopinathan Nair, Mr. C. A Gangadharan, T. K. Sadanandan, P. K. Gangadharan, A. D. Kuttappanachari and Mr. Satyapalan. It was decided that the club will be based in Elavumthitta and the aim and objective of the club will have to promote arts and sports in Elavumthitta. Mr. C. Chandra Dattan as president, Mr. V. R. Gopinathan Nair Secretary, and Mr. A. D. Kutappanachari as vice president the club started its activities.

The popularity of the club was such that everyone in Elavumthitta became the member of the club. Many famous and performing artists of Kerala of those days joined with our Azad Club artists and staged several shows.  Sri. Ayroor Sadasivan and Kottayam Joy were a few to name.
Under the leadership of Azad Club, classes for teaching classical music, tabala, and harmonium were conducted. Azad club had its own gifted members like Mooloor Bala chandran, V.R Gopinathan Nair, Salim Kambisseril etc. to take the fame of Azad club
throughout Kerala. 
Now It might be surprising to many that Azad had its own troupe of ballet. Azad's professional drama troupe staged their drama in several parts of Kerala; why even the remote area like Kumali was not spared. Every month a new drama was the motto of Azad club members.
Azad was also very active in the area of Radio Drama. Almost 15 nos. of radio drama were Performed by the Azad artists. Mr.V.R Gopinathan Nair and Mr. Salim Kambisseril were the drama writers and performing artists. Besides them Mr.P.K Sahadevan, E.N Gangadharan, E.R Rajan, C.A Gangadharan and P.N Ramachandran were the permanent performing artists of Azad club.

Dancer C.R Das, U .N Sreedharan Kutty, Peter, John Philip, Johnson, Joy, and Makeup man Mr. Mathai were an integral part of Azad Club. The club had its own Curtain set, Artist Kesavan was the designer of it. Mr. K Madhavan and Kambisseril Sankaran Vaidyan etc.  Were the prominent Patrons of Azad Club.
The club has its office room in its own three-roomed building situated in Elavumthitta, very close, a stone throw away distance from our legendary Banyan tree. Many of those stalwarts who made this club are no more with us but the club building stands in solitary isolation as a testimony to a glorious past.

Youth clubs in Elavumthitta 
Mooloor Jyothis Arts & Sports Club, Ayathil (Affiliation No. C-001)
Azad Arts & Sports Club, Elavumthitta (Affiliation No. C-002)
Sariga Arts & Sports Club, Planthottathukala (Affiliation No. C-004)
Sangeetha Arts Club, Nediyakala (Affiliation No. C-006)
Sahridaya Vedi, Sahridaya Nagar (Affiliation No. C-007)
Janasakthi Sports Club, Nediyakala (Affiliation NO. C-008)
Suvarna Kala Samskarika Samithi, Ayathil (Affiliation No. C-010)
Soorya Arts &Sports Club, Muttathukonam

Libraries in and around Elavumthitta

 Menon Smaraka Grandhasala,Nediyakala, Mezhuveli
 Janatha Library and Reading Room, Muttathukonam - BIRTH OF A LIBRARY

The year was 1950: Nation was yet to shake off its hangover of the foreign rule. Reading and sharing free thoughts were looked upon as habits of irresponsible youths. Most of the elders were very unhappy on seeing their young ones "idle away" their time in reading. We cannot blame the elders, unlike today, the time was hard then; one has to work day and night to make both ends meet. Watching around, One will be surprised; everything has to be  made;  roads, schools, hospitals, houses, you name a thing necessary for human society; that has to be made. One may really wonder if the world was created only a couple of weeks ago!

Many rural areas were without even elementary schools. Newspaper was a luxury. Malayalam weekly magazines were in great demand; people bought the weekly magazine of their choice sharing the cost by contributing each one few paisa or a little more as the individual could afford. The cost of a most popular Malayalam weekly of that time was only two annas, equivalent of today's twelve paisa per issue. There were no radio or cinema halls in easy reach. It is not that radio was not invented then; there was no money to buy one. Most of the rural people were depending on their meagre agriculture produce for sustaining. Cash crunch was very evident in the day-to-day lifestyle of people. For many, even a shirt was a luxury. It was a custom to extend wedding invitation at least 15 days in advance so that one will have ample time to borrow a shirt from his friends; give it a good wash then get it dry, press and keep it ready for that grand occasion. In such circumstances, buying books or newspapers were not in the reach of a common man. But the youths were restless; revolutionary ideas and free thoughts were spreading very fast. Atheists were looked upon as most modern by the young and most wicked by the old. In this confusion, books were a solace to the young helping to drown their worries and weaving dreams and pandering in to their own imaginative romantic world. 
In this backdrop, wishes of many like-minded persons of Muttathukonam crystallized into forming a library. Yet an external push was required to take off the dream project. It came at last in the shape of news that government was considering of sanctioning one rural library in the vicinity of Elavumthitta. Many places near Elavumthitta—rivals of Muttathukonam in all healthy competitions, if come to know, will snatch it.  First come first was the ‘rule of the game’ then; let us see who will get away with the library.

One afternoon people of Muttathukonam woke up from their siesta, hearing the continuous bell toll from the S N D P building. People rushed in fearing a calamity. They were told that an emergency meeting was to be held. In the closed-door meeting it was decided that within a day or two one government official is visiting Muttathukonam to take stock of the library activities. People were briefed in a hushed tone that library room with a shelf, a bench and desk and if possible a wooden chair and a table must be arranged at least for that occasion. Then someone posed a question:  difficult question indeed, what about the books! There was pin drop silence for a while. Then Mr. T.M Varghese of Thundiyathu got up-

"I will arrange books if someone can give me a helping hand"

Most of the people gathered there were not sure how to react; they know one thing, if T M Varghese commits a thing it will be done. Then and there Mr. Kunjukunju of Mylamootil offered his help. Sri. Kunjukunju Thandar of Thaninilkkunnathil agreed to arrange a space in the corner of SNDP building for the Library. Now for the majority of the members present in the meeting, the feasibility of the library has come within the sighting distance. Someone offered a wooden bench, another said he has got a three-legged table, another said he can fix the fourth leg and let us make the proceeding short; by the end of the meeting, every item required for starting a modest - mind it please not modern but modest - library was offered by one or the other from the audience.

People of Muttathukonam fondly remember the selfless service of Tundiyathu TM Varugheese, Mylamootil Kunjukunju and Thaninilkkunnathil Kunjukunju Thandar in establishing a library in Muttathukonam. They visited every house in Muttathukonam and nearby area and collected old books for the Library. Some books had no cover -

"That is OK we will make the cover"

They collected books like that and painstakingly made the library. The inspector "came, saw, and satisfied": and thus Muttathukonam got JANATHA LIBRARY AND READING ROOM. Hat's off to the trio; they are no more with us.

Library gets radio

1960 –Libraries in affluent areas were having radios of their own. How can Muttathukonam lag behind? A radio will cost minimum Rs. 500/- in those days. That was a huge amount for the local people then. Several meetings were called but it didn't yield any result. Then someone suggested –why not we make a lottery to raise fund for buying radio. A fine idea! Everyone agreed to that proposal. So in the history of the Muttathukonam, yes the first lottery was held. Cost of ticket was 4 anna – one-fourth of a rupee that is today's 25 paisa. The first prize was an alarm clock, a rare item then and a big attraction for a common man. Only a few affluent families had alarm clocks in their homes in those days. Volunteers were pressed into action.  On empty stomach, and parched throat dozens of youngsters were swarmed in to nook and corner of Muttathukonam with the lottery tickets. Where ever two people met, the talk will ultimately lead into lottery. And needless to say everyone had a secret wish that he was going to get the clock. It is heard that one grandmother who never saw a clock in her life told her grandchildren-

"In case we get it where are we going to keep it; no place is safe here; you naughty ones are definitely going to tear it off". The poor lady thought it is something made out of paper!

At last the day came for the lottery. Names were written on small slips of paper, rolled to hide names and put them in a basket. One child was asked to pick up a slip. One lucky person got the prize and it put a full stop to all speculations and excitements of the past few months of who will win dilemma; though disappointment and disbelief was evident on everybody's faces except the winner's. When the gathering heard that the money collected through the proceeding was only little short of the cost for a radio, everyone clapped.

Almanac was consulted, a good day was selected, and Mr. Dharmapala Panicker of Nediyakalayil was entrusted to buy the radio from Pathanamthitta the nearest town. A week later one Murphy Radio- a valve set with magic eye - was bought. One notice on the wall directly above the radio warned that no one except the person authorized was allowed to touch or operate it. 
Young and old looked forward for the evening for hearing film songs of Tamil, Kannada, Telugu and Malayalam from Ceylon radio. There were crowds around the radio during election time for the news. Needless to say, the library and its radio acted as a catalyst to set off cultural changes in Muttathukonam.

 Sariga Grandhasala, Plamthottam, Elavumthitta
 Bapuji Grandhasala, Mezhuveli North
 Mezhuveli Panchayat Samskarika Kendram Grandhasala,Parayankara, Ullanoor
 Gandhiji Smaraka Grandhasala, Ullanoor West
 Progressive Grandhasala, Alakkod, Mezhuveli

Educational institutions

Sreebuddha College of Engineering for Women
Salvation Army L P school, Thumpamon North -
This is the first School of Elavumthitta, established in the year 1903. It celebrated its Centenary year in 2003. The land for the school was donated by Sri.Neelakanta Pillai of Alakkatu. Incidentally, he was also the first headmaster of the School. The school is located 1 km away from Elavumthitta market on the wayside of Ramanchira road.

S N Giri S N D P H S S Chenneerkkara -
It is believed that Adhishankaran visited Chenneerkara in AD 758–820 period. It is also believed that during his visit to this place he met Shaktibhadran, the author of the famous Sanscrit drama "Aachariya Choodamani". There is a belief that the name of Chenneerkara is derived from the domain of Shakti bhadran's "Chenneerkara swarupam". The year 1953 is very important for the people of Chenneerkara. It was in 1953 that S N Giri S N D P School – initially that was the name given to this school – was established. The site selected was close to the Siva temple managed by Branch No.89 of SNDP Union.

Sri.P K Kamalasanan of Pottanjilikkunnel was the founder member and the first manager of the School. People of Chennerkara fondly remember his efforts in establishing this school against all odds. Kerala Kaumudi Editor late Sri. K Sukumaran's help in overcoming hurdles in the beginning days is praiseworthy. After 45 years from the humble beginning, the School was raised to the status of HSS in 1998. By that time  the perseverance of several  dedicated and hardworking managers such as P M Madhavan, K K Bhaskaran, V K Sreedharan, T S Purushothaman, Kunju Panicker, N K Vasu, N Chandra Panicker, V K Narayanan, T N Gopinathan, N D Suresh Kumar and P N Thankappan's noble contributions  elevated this school to envious position among the other schools of the district. Student as far as from Muttathukonam and Elavumthitta used to study in this school in 1960's.Total student strength is about 1000. Nearly 46 teachers and 7 supporting staff are managing this school.
The school can be proud of educating people of this area for the last three decades

S N D P H S S, Muttathukonam North - 
In 1948 people of Muttathukonam joined with the SNDP Union's branch. No. 80 and established one Lower Primary School. Sri. Neelakantan Thandar of Lakshmimangalam, Kinaruvilayil was the founder Manager of the school. Irrespective of caste and creed, everyone in Muttathukonam contributed their mite for the growth of this school. Those days were very hard; most of the people were living in a hand to mouth situation. Each one who had coconut trees willingly earmarked a tree in their compound in the name of school fund and gave the right of coconuts of that tree towards the school fund. People, who had no money and nothing to offer, did voluntary free labour for the construction of the school. The enthusiasm and hard labour of people combined with efficient and dedicated selfless efforts of leadership raised this Lower Primary School to Upper Primary School in 1956.  Mr. P C Samuel of Pulinthitta, Elavumthitta was the first Head Master of the Upper Primary School.

Sri. R Shankar the then education minister of Kerala laid the foundation stone for the High School. Thus the High School becomes a reality in 1962.  In the year 2000–01 the school was upgraded into Higher Secondary School and Sri. P N Chandran was the first principal.

Students of nearby places like Elavumthitta, Ayathil, Chettiyam, Prakkanam, and Nellanikunnu are the main beneficiaries of this Institution. Nearly 1000 students are getting their education in this school. There are about 50 teachers and 8 supporting staff working in this school.

The school is equipped with a computer lab, Science lab and is in the forefront in imparting education in this rural area where most of the people are low income category and is depending only on agriculture for their livelihood. The school is very proud that, in 1980s, the school was the continuous champion in women's volleyball. The best part of the school is; most of the buildings are single-storied with tiled roof and classrooms are well ventilated. The students in their leisure time can move around the spacious compound encircled by the school buildings and breathe fresh air.
CMS high School, Kuzhikkala
Padmanabhodayam H S S, Mezhuveli
Gangadhara Vilasam L P School, Mezhuveli
Teachers Training Institute, Mezhuveli
Govt. Model L P School, Mezhuveli North
U P School, Mezhuveli North
S N Govt. L P School, Kooduvettikkal, Karithotta
Govt. Of India Women's I T I, Elavumthitta
Sarasakavi mooloor smaraka u p school,Chandanakkunnu
Ambedkar English Medium School
Mezhuveli Panchayat I T C
CMS U P School, Nallanikunnu
Sree buddha central schoolCBSC,Ayathil

Temples and Churches in and around Elavumthitta
Elavumthitta Bhagavathy Temple
Elavumthitta Malanada
Ayathil Malanada
Mezhuveli Anandabhootheshawaram Temple
Aranmula Sree Parthasarathi Temple
Omalloor Raktha Kanda Swamy Temple
Pandalam Valiya Koickal Sree Dharma Sastha Temple
Kulakkada Sreemahadeva Temple
Christ The King Catholic Church  Elavinthitta,Punalur Diocese. Established on 4 November 1936. Daily Mas-6:30 am; Sunday at 8:30 am 
Kuzhikkala Marthoma Church
Manjinikkara Church
Bethlehem Marthomma Church
St. Paul's CSI Church Nallanikunnu
Malankara Catholic Church
Sehion Mar Thoma Church
Thabor Mar Thoma Church Pullamala
Jarusalem Mar Thoma Church Ayathil
Ebenezer Marthoma Church Chenneerkara

Gurumandirams in and around Elavumthitta
Malayalam- ഗുരുമന്ദിരം
Sree Narayana Guru the Saint and social reformer of Kerala had a vital role in shaping the lives of people of Elavumthitta. Elevumthitta was fortunate in having the presence of this mystic saint on several occasions as he had close relationship with Mooloor Padmanabha Panicker. Guru, as he was known to his devotees, was a frequent visitor in Mooloor's house in Elavumthitta. Guru being a great visionary realised that without proper education people won't come out of their age-old inhibitions and irrational beliefs. He found that a society divided by caste and religion will never progress. Probably Guru was the first in proclaiming to the world "One caste, one religion, and one god for all". Guru asked his people to make prayer halls where one would feel-
"WITHOUT DIFFERENCE IN CASTE OR RANCOUR OR OF RELIGIONS THIS IS A NOBLE PLACE WHERE ALL LIVE IN BROTHERHOOD"
To propagate and teach Guru's philosophy, many such prayer halls were built throughout Kerala. These prayer halls were known as Guru Mandirams.
Names of such Guru Mandirams in Elavumthitta area are listed below in alphabetical order -

Ayathil in the Compound of Present Mooloor Smarakam. It is more than fifty years old. The Gurumandiram was constructed by Sri.P K Divakara Panicker, Son of Sarasakavi Mooloor Padmanabha Panicker with the money he raised by selling a portion of his property.
Ayathil Jn.- Opened on 27 August 1977 and inaugurated by Sri.K K Viswanathan the then Governor of Gujarat. 
Ampalathumpattu - Opened in 1980 and is managed by Poura Samathy (citizen forum) of that area.
Elavumthitta - Opened and inaugurated by Adv. K Gopinathan on 26 March 1982.
Cheneerkara - Opened in 1985.
Muttathukonam - Opened on 26 December 1978. Installation proceedings were conducted by Sri. Gopalan Thantri, father of famous singers Jaya-Vijayan brothers. One memorable incident – a dance programme was scheduled on 28th the final day of the celebration. R C Kaimal & party the famous dance group of Kerala in those days were commissioned by the organisers paying a princely amount. The dance troupe arrived well in time and people were expectantly waiting to watch the much talked performance, but nature had its own plans. Suddenly at 3:00 pm the sky was overcast with threatening dark clouds and it started raining heavily followed by strong wind. The stage was uprooted and blown away to the adjoining field. However, the dance troupe was magnanimous; they overstayed a day and the show was staged on the next day. 
Mayikunnu (Panil Area) - 
Mezhuveli -
Nediyakala Jn. – The foundation was laid by Sri V M Madhavan on a Sunday 10 October 1948 (Malayalam year 25-03 1124) on Mahanavami day. It took 9 years for completion and was unveiled to the public by Nitiya Chaithaniya Yati the well known philosopher and follower of Guru's ideologies on 8 September 1957 (Malayalam year 23-01-1133). It was a Sunday and above all on Sree Narayana Guru Jayanthi day. The idol of Guru was sculptured by the famous artist A K Achari. It is said that this is the second Gurumandiram opened in Kerala, the first one was built in Thalasseri. 
Pullamala - opened on 14-04-1988. Land for the Mandiram was donated by Kodankalayil family.
Ramanchira -
Thumpamon- Kalavedi -
Thundukadu -

Writers / Litterateurs
Mooloor S Padmanabha Panicker
Kambisseri Karunakaran
Suresh Gangadharan

See also
 Mooloor S.Padmanabha Panicker
 K. C. Rajagopalan (EX. MLA, Aranmula)
 P. N. Chandrasenan (Ex. MLA, Aranmula)
 Kambisseri Karunakaran (Chief Editor Janayugam)

References

1 Manorama-Malayalam news paper/dated 23 April 2014

2 www.thehindu.com/today's-paper/tp-national/.../article4271637.ece

3 www.Facebook.com/elavumthitta

History of Pathanamthitta district